Gjokaj is an Albanian surname of the Triesh clan of Malësia region of southeastern Montenegro. Gjokajs from Triesh trace their ancestral origins from the village of Muzheçku, Triesh. The name of Muzheçku comes from the ancient ancestor that bond Gjokajs and Nikollajs (also from Muzheçku) in their bloodline, Muzh Marashi. The name Gjokaj is derived from the ancient ancestor of Gjok Lumi, the grandson of Muzh Marashi. Most of the current descendants of the Gjokaj clan derive from Ivan Mali's three sons:
Prel Ivani
Gjek Ivani
Lek Ivani

The Gjokajs of Triesh are direct descendants of the ancient ancestor, Ban Keqi. He is the brother of Lazër Keqi (Hoti tribe). Edith Durham’s book High Albania makes reference to the direct correlation between the Keqi brothers and the significance of the bloodlines. In her book, she describes what was said by a Malësor of the Hot tribe in one of the many villages she explored in the highland regions of northern Albania in 1909:

“And half the tribe of Triepshi, the stem of Bakechi, is of Hoti blood. We cannot marry them. The other half–the Bekaj–we can. They are not our blood; they come from Kopliku. Triepshi belongs to Montenegro now, but is all Catholic.” (Durham, 1909)
 
The direct descendants of the Gjokaj include:
Prel, Gjek & Lek Ivani (Brothers and descendants of the majority of current Gjokajs)
Ivan Mali
Mal Prëgza
Prëgz Gjoka
Gjok Lumi (Ancestor of which the Gjokaj name derives)
Lum Muzhi
Muzh Marashi (The ancestor that the name of the town, "Muzheçku" is derived)
Marash Pata
Pat Bani
Ban Keqi (brother of "Lazar Keqi" of the Hoti tribe of Malësi e Madhe)

Current members of the Gjokaj clan of Triesh predominantly live in parts of Tuzi, Montenegro and surrounding areas of Malësia. A large majority of Gjokajs have immigrated to the United States starting in the early 1970s in search of a better living for their families and the strive for the American dream. The majority of Gjokajs residing in the US live in close-knit Albanian American communities throughout the US, predominantly in Metro Detroit and within the New York City metropolitan area.

References

Durham, E. (1909). High Albania. London: Edward Arnold.

Albanian-language surnames